Avibrissina is a genus of bristle flies in the family Tachinidae. There are at least two described species in Avibrissina.

Species
These two species belong to the genus Avibrissina:
 Avibrissina brevipalpis Malloch, 1932 c g
 Avibrissina laticornis Malloch, 1938 c g
Data sources: i = ITIS, c = Catalogue of Life, g = GBIF, b = Bugguide.net

References

Further reading

External links

 
 

Tachinidae